Juan Masferrer Pellizzari (19 November 1940 – 28 December 2017) was a Chilean politician.

Born in 1940, he attended the Escuela de Especialidades de la Fuerza Aérea. A member of the Independent Democratic Union, Masferrer was first elected to the Chamber of Deputies in 1989 as a representative of District 34. He retained his seat in four consecutive reelection campaigns, in 1993, 1997, 2001, and 2005. Masferrer was succeeded by Javier Macaya in 2010. Masferrer married Jacqueline Vidal Delaigue, with whom he had three children. He died on 28 December 2017, aged 77.

References

1940 births
2017 deaths
Independent Democratic Union politicians
Members of the Chamber of Deputies of Chile